Ohlhausen is a German surname. The name has several variations but the origins are one of the oldest in Europe and can be traced to 186CE to its first mention in the Franco-Roman Census found near Jagsthausen. The ancient hamlet of Olnhausen, Germany  near Heilbronn is still in existence.

The name's meaning is 'house of eel'. Several Ohlhausen family crests bear a house and eels. Ael/ahl/ohl are all Germanic  etymological variations of the English word "eel".

Variations of the name: Olnhausen, Ohlhausen, Olhausen, Aelhausen, etc.

People
Henrich von Olnhausen -Knights Templar of the Crusades, conferred the Order of the Golden Spur in 1388 at Jerusalem
Mary Phinney von Olnhausen (1818–1902) Civil War Nurse, whose exploits during the American Civil War were chronicled in "Adventures of an Army Nurse in Two Wars: Baroness von Olnhausen"-by Mary Phinney, 1903
Maureen Ohlhausen -Attorney, Federal Trade Commissioner appointed by Barack Obama

See also
Ohlhauser

German-language surnames